Origin is the second full-length album by American post-hardcore band Dayseeker. The album was released on April 21, 2015 via InVogue Records.

Production history
Alex Polk announced in mid-December 2014 that the band would fly to Ohio to record the new album with record producer Nick Ingram who worked with bands like Before Their Eyes and Hotel Books in the past.

The band recorded a cover song of Jealous originally released by Nick Jonas which fans were able to download when they pre-ordered the record at MerchNow.

The album's track list was leaked on April 2, 2015.

Releases and promotion
The first song the band released on March 26, 2015 was the same-titled song Origin. Another song was released by InVogue Records on YouTube on April 3, 2015. It is called A Cancer Uncontained. The latest single, The Earth Will Turn was released on April 15, 2015 just one week before the album's official release.

On April 18, 2015 the band headed out for a short US run with Silent Planet to promote their new record. The tour ended on May 4, 2015 in Indianapolis, Indiana after eleven shows.

Success

Critical reception
Origin received nearly exclusively positive reviews. The lyrical themes and the singing voice of vocalist Rory Rodriguez were praised by some reviewers.

Charting
Origin peaked at No. 1 at iTunes metal charts. The album sold exactly 1,150 copies during the first sales week, resulting Origin being the first charting album ever. It peaked on no. 20 at Billboard Heatseekers Charts in charting week of May 9, 2015.

Track listing

Personnel

Dayseeker
 Rory Rodriguez – unclean vocals, clean vocals
 Alex Polk – guitar
 Gino Scambelluri – guitar
 Andrew Sharp – bass
 Mike Karle – drums

Additional personnel
 Nick Ingram – producer, mixing, mastering
 Bailey Zindel – art design
 Dana Willax – guest vocals on track 1

References

2015 albums
Dayseeker albums
InVogue Records albums